Martin Červeňák (born 11 January 1999) is a Slovak footballer who currently plays for FK Senica as a defender.

Club career

FK Senica
Červeňák made his professional Fortuna Liga's debut for FK Senica on 1 October 2016 against Spartak Myjava.

References

External links
 FK Senica profile
 
 Futbalnet profile

1999 births
Living people
Slovak footballers
Association football defenders
FK Senica players
Slovak Super Liga players